MacKeeper is computer software for macOS. MacKeeper was developed by ZeoBIT, later acquired by Kromtech, and is currently owned by Clario Tech. 

MacKeeper has a troubled and litigious history. Zeobit settled a class action lawsuit accusing them of deceptive advertising and making false claims about MacKeeper's capabilities, and Kromtech unsuccessfully sued MacKeeper critics. Some versions are difficult to uninstall, and some versions have been flagged as undesirable by other anti-virus programs. In 2015, the personal information of 13 million users was publicly accessible on the web.

History
MacKeeper was first released in 2010 by Zeobit. Versions 1 and 2 received mixed reviews. A 2011 press release by Avira and ZeoBIT revealed that MacKeeper integrated Avira's antivirus scanning engine. In April 2013, MacKeeper was acquired by Kromtech. Kromtech was closely affiliated with Zeobit, and hired many former Kyiv-based Zeobit employees. In December 2015, security researcher Chris Vickery found that MacKeeper customer data was unsecured and publicly accessible on the internet, exposing the emails, phone numbers, and other information of over 13 million MacKeeper users; Kromtech rapidly secured the customer database. In 2019, a newly-founded company, Clario Tech, acquired Kromtech and MacKeeper.

Reception

Coverage 

Many antivirus programs classified MacKeeper version 3 as a potentially unwanted program or adware and prompted users to remove it. The official uninstaller "[left] pieces behind", resulting in regular pop-ups to convince users to reinstall the app. Business Insider recommended users avoid or uninstall the product. Both Tom's Guide and MacWorld have published how-to guides for deleting the software.
Version 1 & 2 of the program received mixed reviews, with reviewers being divided as to the effectiveness of the software. Some versions of MacKeeper opened a critical security hole in customers' Macs; Kromtech later issued a fix. AV-Comparatives found that MacKeeper warned of "serious" issues on a brand-new clean copy of macOS, which could only be fixed by purchasing the program. This was deemed scareware by cybersecurity journalist Brian Krebs. French news outlet Le Figaro called MacKeeper a scam, and criticized its reliance on "fear". Computerworld described MacKeeper as "a virulent piece of software".

MacKeeper's marketing tactics drew criticism. Zeobit was accused of employing aggressive pop-under ads, planting sockpuppet reviews, and setting up websites to discredit its competitors. In 2015, PCWorld noted that MacKeeper ads were "all over the web", and that Kromtech claimed to be buying 60 million ad impressions a month. MacKeeper was in part promoted by affiliate sellers, who could earn a 50% commission for sales of the app. Some affiliates promoted MacKeeper in adware. After media criticism, Kromtech claimed it revamped its affiliate program.

MacKeeper's usefulness was disputed by tech media; anti-malware, secure erase, backup, encryption, and anti-theft were either built-into macOS or available for free. Top Ten Reviews noted that other Mac anti-malware apps had better detection rates, resulting in a score of 7.5 out of 10. A July 2017 AV-TEST assessment found MacKeeper only detected 85.9 percent of the tested malware.

Lawsuits 

In January 2014, a class action lawsuit was filed against Zeobit in Illinois. The lawsuit alleged that "neither the free trial nor the full registered versions of MacKeeper performed any credible diagnostic testing" and reported that a consumer's Mac was in need of repair and was at-risk due to harmful error. In May 2014 a lawsuit was filed against Zeobit in Pennsylvania, alleging that MacKeeper fakes security problems to deceive victims into paying for unneeded fixes. Customers who bought MacKeeper before 8 July 2015 could apply to get a refund.

Kromtech also filed at least two unsuccessful defamation lawsuits against MacKeeper critics. In July 2013 Kromtech sued MacPaw, the developers of CleanMyMac, which was dismissed before the hearing. In 2014, Kromtech sued David A. Cox, who had made a video criticizing MacKeeper; the judge dismissed the case. In July 2016, Kromtech sent a cease and desist letter to Luqman Wadood, a 14-year old technology reviewer who made YouTube videos critical of the app; Luqman said the videos were diplomatic.

Acquisition 
In 2019, MacKeeper was acquired by a newly-founded company, Clario Tech. In November 2020, Clario released MacKeeper 5, which received 3.5 of 5 start reviews from TechRadar and Macworld. The app was certified by AV-TEST. The new version includes a VPN, on-demand virus scanning, a memory cleaner, and a disk cleaner.

See also

 Comparison of antivirus software
 Comparison of firewalls

References

Antivirus software
Proprietary software
MacOS-only software
Utilities for macOS
MacOS security software